Durga 

eJonubi Rural District is a rural district (dehestan) in Ramand District, Buin Zahra County, Qazvin Province, Iran. At the 2006 census, its population was 5,339, in 1,296 families.  The rural district has 9 villages.

References 

Rural Districts of Qazvin Province
Buin Zahra County